The 1440s BC is a decade which lasted from 1449 BC to 1440 BC.

Events and trends
 1449 BC: Fíachu Labrainne, Milesians' High King of Ireland, is killed and succeeded by Eochu Mumu
 c. 1448 BC: The Gnbtyw people (Genebtyw or Genebtyu) first appear in Ganibatum during the 32nd year of the reign of Thutmose III, the sixth Pharaoh of the Eighteenth dynasty of Egypt
 1445–1444 BC: The Book of Leviticus is written.
 c. 1440 BC: first recorded urban settlement on or near Mount Yamanlar which controlled the Gulf of İzmir

References